Helmut Schmidt (born June 9, 1949) is a German retired football player. He spent four seasons in the Bundesliga with FC Bayern Munich and Kickers Offenbach.

Honours
 Bundesliga champion: 1969
 Bundesliga runner-up: 1970
 DFB-Pokal winner: 1969, 1970

External links
 

German footballers
Germany under-21 international footballers
FC Bayern Munich footballers
Kickers Offenbach players
Borussia Dortmund players
FC Ingolstadt 04 players
Bundesliga players
1949 births
Living people
Association football midfielders
Footballers from Munich
TSV 1860 Rosenheim players